Albert Park is a cricket and rugby union ground in Te Awamutu, Waikato, New Zealand.  The first recorded cricket match held on the ground came in 1980 when Midlands played Bay of Plenty in the 1980/81 Hawke Cup.  The ground later held a first-class match in the 1987/88 Shell Trophy when Northern Districts played Central Districts, with the match ending in a draw.

References

External links
Albert Park at ESPNcricinfo
Albert Park at CricketArchive

Rugby union stadiums in New Zealand
Cricket grounds in New Zealand
Rugby league stadiums in New Zealand
Sports venues in Waikato
Te Awamutu